The 2013 BBL-Pokal – officially named 2013 Beko BBL-Pokal because of sponsorship reasons – was the 46th season of the German Basketball Cup. It was the 4th season as the League Cup for the BBL. The Final Four was held at the O2 World in Berlin, which gained ALBA Berlin automatic qualification for the tournament. The other 6 participating teams were selected through the standings of the first half of the 2012–13 Basketball Bundesliga.

Home team ALBA Berlin won the BBL-Pokal, by beating ratiopharm Ulm 85–67 in the Final.

Participants
The following six teams qualified based on their standings in the 2012–13 Basketball Bundesliga.
Brose Baskets
EWE Baskets Oldenburg
Bayern Munich
ratiopharm Ulm
Artland Dragons
TBB Trier
ALBA Berlin was qualified because the Final Four was played at their home court.

Bracket

References

BBL-Pokal seasons
BBL-Pokal